Hipposcarus is a genus of marine ray-finned fishes, parrotfish from the family Scaridae. The two species in the genus are distributed in the Indo-Pacific.
.

Species
Hipposcarus harid (Forsskål, 1775)
Hipposcarus longiceps (Valenciennes, 1840)

References

 
Scaridae
Marine fish genera
Taxa named by J. L. B. Smith